Plectromerus dezayasi is a species of beetle in the family Cerambycidae. It was described by Nearns and Branham in 2008.

The female is 8.0–9.5 mm long and 1.8–2.1 mm wide.; the male is 9.9 mm long and 2.2 mm wide.

References

Cerambycinae
Beetles described in 2008